is a Japanese singer, voice actor, and live streamer. He is a member of the J-pop group Strawberry Prince.

Biography 
Rinu was born on 24 May 1998 in Tokyo, Japan. As a child, his family was constantly in debt, and he had a poor relationship with his parents. One of his childhood friends died from cancer in junior high school; he decided to become a voice actor because this friend's dream was to be a voice actor. He became interested in singers on Nico Nico Douga to impress a classmate in whom he had a romantic interest, and began uploading his own song covers to the site in late 2015. In mid-2016, he was recruited by Nanamori to join Strawberry Prince.

From 2018 to 2019, Rinu played the character of Fūma Shirayuki in HoneyWorks's fictional idol unit "Dolce". He recorded one album with the group before it disbanded.

On 11 December 2019, Rinu released his first full solo album, Time Capsule. It placed second on the Oricon weekly album ranking, and first on the Oricon daily album ranking. Additionally, the song "Ruma" from the album placed ninth on the Oricon YouTube chart. His second solo album, Shutter Chance!, released on 12 January 2022 and placed second on the Oricon weekly album ranking, and first on the Oricon daily album ranking.

On 24 May 2021, Rinu released an official fanbook, Rinu Memory. The book sold 56,000 copies its first week, and ranked first on the Oricon weekly book ranking.

As a voice actor, Rinu often goes by the name Koinu.

Rinu came out as transgender in 2017. He underwent gender-affirming surgery in October 2022.

Discography

Albums

Singles

Filmography

Anime

Video games

References

External links 

 Official YouTube channel

Living people
Japanese male pop singers
1998 births
Utaite
Transgender male musicians
Japanese transgender people
Japanese YouTubers
People from Tokyo
Japanese male voice actors
Transgender male actors
Japanese LGBT singers
Transgender singers